Urs Aeberhand (sometimes known as Urs Aeberhard) is a Swiss bobsledder who competed from the late 1990s to the early 2000s. He won three bronze medals at the FIBT World Championships (Two-man: 2000, Four-man: 2000, FIBT World Championships 2001).

Aeberhand also finished sixth in the four-man event at Salt Lake City in 2002.

References
Bobsleigh two-man world championship medalists since 1931
Bobsleigh four-man world championship medalists since 1930
CNN-Sports Illustrated 2002 bobsleigh four-man results

Bobsledders at the 2002 Winter Olympics
Living people
Swiss male bobsledders
Year of birth missing (living people)
Olympic bobsledders of Switzerland
21st-century Swiss people